Iniyum Puzhayozhukum is a 1978 Indian Malayalam film,  directed by I. V. Sasi and produced by N. G. John. The film stars Lakshmi, M. G. Soman, Vidhubala and Jayan in the lead roles. The film has musical score by G. Devarajan.

Cast

Lakshmi as Celin Thomas
M. G. Soman as Prabhakaran
Vidhubala as Radha
Jayan as Mr. Nambiar
Sathar as Salim
Adoor Bhavani as Celin Thomas' Servant
Alummoodan as Shekhar
Bahadoor as Prabhakaran's Father
Janardanan as Sukumaran
Jose as Alex
Sankaradi as Mr. Kurup
Sreelatha Namboothiri
Muralimohan as Mr.  Thomas
 T. P. Madhavan as Doctor

Soundtrack
The music was composed by G. Devarajan and the lyrics were written by Yusufali Kechery.

References

External links

view the film
 

1978 films
1970s Malayalam-language films
Films directed by I. V. Sasi